Mary Ann Cooke (1784-1868) was a British missionary and educator, active in Calcutta in India.  In 1821, she became the first single female missionary to be sent from England to India, and founded a network of missionary girls' schools in Calcutta, which were famous as the first schools for girls in India, laying the foundation for modern female education in India.

References 

1784 births
1868 deaths
British people in colonial India
British Christian missionaries
19th-century British educators
19th century in Kolkata
19th-century Indian women